Philippe Davies (born December 12, 1990) is a Canadian retired soccer player.

Career

Youth and college
Born in Longueuil, Quebec, Davies attended Collège Français in his hometown. He played for the under-15 and under-16 sides of Ligue de soccer élite du Québec team FC Select South Shore AAA from 2003 to 2005. He spent a year in France in 2006, playing for the under-16 and reserve team of Ligue 2 team Dijon FCO, before playing for the FC Select South Shore AAA under-18 side in 2007.

He signed for the Vancouver Whitecaps Residency on October 10, 2007, playing for them in the USL Premier Development League in 2008 and 2009 season.

Professional
Davies made his debut for the senior Vancouver Whitecaps team in a 4–0 victory over Minnesota Thunder on July 9, 2009.

Vancouver declined its 2012 contract option on Davies on January 20, 2012.

After two seasons with the Richmond Kickers, Davies signed with the Ottawa Fury in their first North American Soccer League season in 2014.

Davies was re-signed by Ottawa for the 2015 season, but would only make 5 appearances after breaking his arm in pre-season. In August 2015, he announced his retirement at the age of 24 and his move to a coaching position with ARS Rive-Sud where he grew up. This was due to his father's battle with cancer and the resulting need to be close to his family. In December 2015 however, Davies signed with local PLSQ club CS Longueuil at the instigation of the club's then-head coach, Mathieu Rufié.

International
Davies is a former Canada under-17 and under-20 member and he played 17 games, scoring four goals for both teams. Davies made his senior team debut on January 26, 2013, in a friendly against Denmark as a second half sub for Terry Dunfield, the game ended as a 4–0 defeat.

Personal life
His father Randolph is former professional Canadian baseball player who was born in Montreal, Quebec, and his mother was born in Saint-Jean d’Iberville, Quebec. Davies played hockey and soccer in his childhood.

Club Statistics

Updated: August 20, 2011

References

External links

Vancouver Whitecaps bio

1990 births
Living people
Sportspeople from Longueuil
Canadian soccer players
Association football defenders
Association football midfielders
Association football utility players
Dijon FCO players
Vancouver Whitecaps Residency players
Vancouver Whitecaps (1986–2010) players
Vancouver Whitecaps FC players
Vancouver Whitecaps FC U-23 players
Richmond Kickers players
Ottawa Fury FC players
Expatriate soccer players in the United States
USL League Two players
USL First Division players
USSF Division 2 Professional League players
USL Championship players
North American Soccer League players
Première ligue de soccer du Québec players
Canadian expatriate soccer players
Canadian expatriate sportspeople in France
Canada men's youth international soccer players
Canada men's under-23 international soccer players
Canada men's international soccer players
Homegrown Players (MLS)